This is a list of 18th-century chaconnes.  Included are all pieces of 18th-century music, or clearly marked off sections of pieces, labeled "chaconne" (or some variant of that word) by their composers, that have been found by contributors to this article among the works of musicians, musicologists, and music historians.  A few pieces not labeled "chaconne" by their composers, when they have been clearly identified as chaconnes by later commentators, have also been included.  A definitive list would be impossible to make, because there was in the 18th century, and there remains today, disagreement about the defining characteristics of a chaconne. That subject is treated in the article Chaconne.

Jump to decade:

Bibliography

 Available at http://imslp.org/wiki/Pi%C3%A8ces_de_clavecin_%28Agincour,_Fran%C3%A7ois_d%27%29
 This book's HVW catalog available at http://imslp.org/wiki/List_of_works_by_George_Frideric_Handel
 Bibliothèque nationale de France, Gallica
 Available at http://gallica.bnf.fr/ark:/12148/btv1b90832308/f1.image.r=boismortier%20serenades.langEN 
 Available at http://gallica.bnf.fr/ark:/12148/btv1b90642212/f1.image.r=boismortier%20fragmens.langEN
 Available at http://imslp.org/wiki/Daphnis_et_Chlo%C3%A9,_Op.102_%28Boismortier,_Joseph_Bodin_de%29
 International Music Score Library Project
 

 Available at http://imslp.org/wiki/Concerts_royaux_%28Couperin,_Fran%C3%A7ois%29
 Available at http://imslp.org/wiki/Les_go%C3%BBts-r%C3%A9unis,_ou_Nouveaux_concerts_%28Couperin,_Fran%C3%A7ois%29
 Available at http://imslp.org/wiki/Les_Nations_%28Couperin,_Fran%C3%A7ois%29
 Available at http://imslp.org/wiki/Pi%C3%A8ces_de_Clavecin_%28Couperin,_Fran%C3%A7ois%29

 Available at http://imslp.org/wiki/Pi%C3%A8ces_de_clavecin_%28Du_Phly,_Jacques%29
 International Music Score Library Project
 Available at http://imslp.org/wiki/Pi%C3%A8ces_de_viole_%28Forqueray,_Antoine%29
 This book's G catalog available at http://imslp.org/wiki/List_of_works_by_Luigi_Boccherini
 International Music Score Library Project

 International Music Score Library Project

 International Music Score Library Project
 

 Available at http://imslp.org/wiki/Deuxi%C3%A8me_r%C3%A9cr%C3%A9ation_de_musique,_Op.8_%28Leclair,_Jean-Marie%29
 5 vols. Available at http://imslp.org/wiki/Pi%C3%A8ces_de_viole_(Marais,_Marin)
 Available at http://imslp.org/wiki/S%C3%A9m%C3%A9l%C3%A9_%28Marais,_Marin%29

 Available at http://gallica.bnf.fr/ark:/12148/btv1b9010026t/f2.zoom.r=morel,%20jacques.langEN
 Available at http://imslp.org/wiki/Les_amours_des_dieux_%28Mouret,_Jean-Joseph%29
 In Luntz, Erwin, ed. Denkmäler der Tonkunst in Österreich, vol. 23, pp. 75–104.  Vienna: Österreichischer Bundesverlag.  Available at http://imslp.org/wiki/Propitia_sydera_%28Muffat,_Georg%29
 Available at http://imslp.org/wiki/Componimenti_musicali_%28Muffat,_Gottlieb%29 
 Available at http://imslp.org/wiki/Les_caract%C3%A8res_de_la_danse_%28Rebel,_Jean-F%C3%A9ry%29
 Available at http://imslp.org/wiki/Fantaisie_%28Rebel,_Jean-F%C3%A9ry%29
 Available at http://imslp.org/wiki/Les_Plaisirs_Champ%C3%AAtres_%28Rebel,_Jean-F%C3%A9ry%29
 Available at http://imslp.org/wiki/Les_%C3%A9l%C3%A9ments_%28Rebel,_Jean-F%C3%A9ry%29
 This book's TWV catalog available at http://imslp.org/wiki/List_of_works_by_Georg_Philipp_Telemann
 This book's RV catalog available at http://imslp.org/wiki/List_of_works_by_Antonio_Vivaldi
 Available at http://imslp.org/wiki/Le_nymphe_di_Rheno,_Op.8_%28Schenck,_Johann%29
 This book's BWV catalog available at http://imslp.org/wiki/List_of_works_by_Johann_Sebastian_Bach

 Available at http://imslp.org/wiki/Pi%C3%A8ces_de_Clavecin,_Livre_2_%28Siret,_Nicolas%29

 Available ahttp://imslp.org/wiki/Pi%C3%A8ces_de_th%C3%A9orbe_et_de_luth_%28Vis%C3%A9e,_Robert_de%29t 

 International Music Score Library Project
 This book's Sm catalog available at http://www.slweiss.de/index.php?id=3&type=worklist&lang=eng&smith
 This book's Wq catalog available at http://imslp.org/wiki/List_of_works_by_Christoph_Willibald_Gluck

Baroque dance
18th century in music